Virtua Tennis: World Tour (Power Smash: New Generation in Japan) is a tennis video game which was released for the Sony PlayStation Portable.

Overview
Virtua Tennis: World Tour was first released on 1 September 2005 in Europe with a North American release following shortly afterwards on 6 October. It was later released in Japan on 26 January 2006 under the title Power Smash: New Generation.

The game features 14 real-life professional tennis players, four court surfaces (with multiple arenas of each surface) and multiple game modes.

Game modes

World Tour
This is the main 1-player mode of Virtua Tennis: World Tour. In this mode, the players create one male and one female character for use in all tournaments in the game to become the No. #1-ranked player in the world. In between tournaments, skill levels may be raised by competing in a variety of quick minigames.

Quick Match
As it sounds, Quick Match just throws into a match, automatically selecting the players and court.

Ball Games
A few minigames for a short play time. These are Blocker, Balloon Smash, Fruit Dash and Blockbuster.

Tournament
The players select a player and attempt to play through 6 matches in order to win a tournament. Courts are automatically selected. There is also a retry option which enables the player to try to win again and again.

Exhibition
The player selects a player, opponent and a court.

Multiplayer
Using the PSP's Wi-Fi capabilities, up to 4 players can compete in a tennis match.

Reception
In a GameSpot review, Virtua Tennis: World Tour received a score of 8.2. IGN gave the game "8.5". However, many critics were disappointed by the added element of two fictional female players, on the account of the high numbers of top players in the WTA.

References

2005 video games
PlayStation Portable games
Sega video games
Sports video games set in the United States
Video games developed in the United Kingdom
Video games set in Australia
Video games set in Brazil
Video games set in Canada
Video games set in France
Video games set in Germany
Video games set in Hong Kong
Video games set in Japan
Video games set in Morocco
Video games set in Qatar
Video games set in Russia
Video games set in Singapore
Video games set in South Africa
Video games set in Spain
Video games set in Sweden
Video games set in the United Kingdom
PlayStation Portable-only games
World Tour
Tennis video games
Sumo Digital games
Multiplayer and single-player video games